This is a list of notable past and present musicians in Ghana.

Afrojazz 
 Guy Warren
 Rebop Kwaku Baah

Afropop 
 KiDi
 Becca
 Fuse ODG
 Jay Ghartey
 Osibisa
 Wendy Shay
 Dobble

Afrobeats
Darkovibes
Mugeez
KiDi
Kuami Eugene
Kelvyn Boy
Wendy Shay
Gyakie
Dobble

Dancehall 
 Ebony Reigns
 Iwan
 Kaakie
 Samini
 Shatta Wale
 Stonebwoy

Gospel 
 Bernice Ofei
 Danny Nettey
 Helen Yawson
 Joe Beecham
 Joe Mettle
 Kofi Owusu Dua Anto
 Nayaah
 Nii Okai
 Ohemaa Mercy
 Preachers
 QwameGaby
 Stella Aba Seal
 Tagoe Sisters
 Diana Hamilton
 Joyce Blessing

Soul/ RnB 
Efya
Cina Soul
Amaarae
Akwaboah Jnr

Highlife 
 A. B. Crentsil
 Alex Konadu
 Amakye Dede
 Ben Brako
 Bisa Kdei
 C.K. Mann
 Daddy Lumba
 E. T. Mensah
 Ebo Taylor
 K. Frimpong
 King Bruce
 Kojo Antwi
 Koo Nimo
 Kwabena Kwabena
 Jerry Hansen
Nana Acheampong
Dobble

Hiplife 
 Amerado
Ayesem
 Ayigbe Edem
 Ball J
 Bice Osei Kuffour
 Dobble
 Buk Bak
 C-Real
 Castro
 Corp Sayvee
 D-Black
Dead Peepol
 Efya
 EL
 Eno Barony
 Gasmilla
 Kesse
 M.anifest
 Medikal
 Nero X
 Okyeame Kwame
 Reggie Rockstone
 Ruff n Smooth
 Sarkodie
 Sherifa Gunu
 Strongman
Sway
 Tinny
 Trigmatic
 Joey B
 Pappy Kojo
 Gurunkz
 R2Bees
 Kofi Kinaata
 Kwesi Arthur
 KiDi
 Kuami Eugene
K.K Fosu
Ofori Amponsah

Reggae 
 Adam Ro
 Bobo Shanti
 Rascalimu
 Rita Marley
 Rocky Dawuni
 Samini
 Sheriff Ghale
 Stonebwoy
Fancy Gadam

Composers/others 
 Abubakari Lunna
 Ephraim Amu
 Ken Kafui
 Philip Gbeho

Ghanaian musicians
Musicians
Ghanaian